Leonardo Enrique Rolheiser better known as Camoranesi 2 is an Argentine footballer who plays as a midfielder for Racing Club de Avellaneda of the Primera Division Argentina.

Biography Football 
He debuted in an official match against Colon de Santa Fe (1-1 tie) replacing Mauro Camoranesi.
His first spell with the first team was in a friendly against River Plate, also 1-1 tie in 2013.
Currently, he has played 5 games without scoring goals. In January 2014 Mostaza Merlo named Rolheiser in the squad going to preseason in Tandil and would sign his first contract.

Teams

External links 
 
 
 

Year of birth missing (living people)
Living people
Racing Club de Avellaneda footballers
Argentine footballers
Association football midfielders